The Miami drug war was a series of armed conflicts in the 1970s and 1980s, centered in the Florida city of Miami, between the United States government and multiple drug cartels, primarily the Medellín Cartel. It was predominantly fueled by the illegal trafficking of cocaine.

The drug war was triggered by the Dadeland Mall shootout; On July 11 1979 in broad daylight, two gunmen of a Colombian drug gang entered and shot two men at a liquor store. The murderers were immediately dubbed "Cocaine Cowboys" by a police officer. Violence became endemic in Miami. In 1980 the city had 573 murders in the year, and the next year had 621 murders. By 1981 the city morgue had an overload of dead bodies and were forced to rent out a refrigerated truck to keep the bodies, keeping it until 1988. Most of the violent crime was directly related to conflicts in the city's growing drug trade. Miami in 1981 was responsible for trafficking 70% of the country's cocaine, 70% of the country's marijuana, and 90% of the country's counterfeit Quaaludes.

Much of Miami's drug trafficking activity was centered out of Coconut Grove's Mutiny at Sailboat Bay, where drug traffickers would frequently meet and conduct business. By 1981 crime in Miami had become so rampant from the cocaine trade that journalist Roben Farzad argues Miami was a failed state. During the time major traffickers like the Falcon brothers and Sal Magluta smuggled in around 2 billion dollars of cocaine from Colombia. Medellín cartel traffickers Rafael Cardona Salazar, Mickey Munday, Jon Roberts, Griselda Blanco and Max Mermelstein brought in loads of drugs from Colombia with the help of Jorge "Rivi" Ayala as a hitman responsible for around three dozen murders.

Miami soon became known as the "Drug Capital of the World" due to ensuing turf wars between drug lords. One of the top leaders of drug trafficking in Miami was Colombian drug lord Griselda Blanco, who was a pioneer in cocaine trafficking and was responsible for more than 200 murders. With the collapse of the Medellín Cartel and various other drug trafficking organizations, the drug war diminished.

References

History of Miami
1980s in Miami
Organized crime conflicts in the United States
Medellín Cartel